The V. P. Engel'gardt Astronomical Observatory, also known simply as the Engelhardt Observatory, is located 20 kilometers west of Kazan, Russia. Its observatory code is 136.

Zelenchukskaya Station 

The observatory's Zelenchukskaya Station, observatory code 114, abbreviated as "Zelenchukskaya Stn" by the IAU/MPC, is located at  altitude near Zelenchukskaya in the North Caucasus region of the Caucasus Mountains, using a 0.3-meter f/7.7 reflector.

The Station is known for it numerous cometary observations (see external links) and discoveries of minor planets by Russian amateur astronomer Timur Valer'evič Krjačko. In addition, the MPC directly credits the Zelenchukskaya Station for the discovery of 6 minor planets in 2008 (see list), which includes 212929 Satovski, a main-belt asteroid named after Boris Ivanovich Satovski (1908–1982), a laureate of the USSR State Prize.

Note, the Special Astrophysical Observatory of the Russian Academy of Science with its Large Altazimuth Telescope is also located near Zelenchukskaya.

List of discovered minor planets

See also 
 List of asteroid-discovering observatories
 
 List of observatory codes

References

External links 
 Comet Observations (114 Engelhardt Observatory, Zelenchukskaya Station), database search at SAO/NASA Astrophysics Data System (ADS)

Astronomical observatories in Russia

Minor-planet discovering observatories
Cultural heritage monuments of regional significance in Tatarstan